The 2019 United Women's Soccer season is the 25th season of pro-am women's soccer in the United States, and the fourth season of the UWS league.

Changes from 2018 
 Syracuse Development Academy joined the league and was placed in the East Conference.
 AFC Ann Arbor joined the league and was placed in the Midwest Conference.
 San Antonio Athenians SC joined the league and was placed in the Southwest Conference.
 Queen City United SC (Regina, Saskatchewan) joined the league and was placed in the West Conference.
 Indy Premier was renamed Indiana Union
 Fort Wayne United FC Gryphons, Genesee FC, HAR FC, New York Surf, North Texas Image, Real Salt Lake Women, SoCal Crush FC and Western New York Flash left the league.

Standings

East Conference

Midwest Conference

Southwest Conference

West Conference

Playoffs

East Conference Playoffs 
Top two seeds host semifinal games. Highest remaining seed hosts final and the winner will automatically qualify for the UWS national championship.

Bold = winner* = after extra time, = penalty shootout score

Midwest Conference Playoffs 
Top two seeds host Semifinal games. Highest remaining seed hosts Final and the winner will automatically qualify for the UWS National Championship.

Bold = winner* = after extra time, = penalty shootout score

National Playoffs 
Southwest Conference regular season conference champion (Houston) plays in the national quarterfinal against a wild card selection (opponent and date to be announced). Wild card selection to be determined by the league's Competition Committee. Winner of national quarterfinal qualifies for the UWS national championship. The West Conference regular season champion automatically qualifies for the UWS national championship.

Bold = winner* = after extra time, = penalty shootout score

Quarterfinal

Semifinals

UWS Championship

Championship MVP: Catarina Macario (LA Galaxy Orange County)

Statistical leaders

Top scorers 

Source:

Top assists 

Source:

|}

League awards

Individual Awards
Offensive Player of the Year: Kate Howarth (NEM)
Defensive Player of the Year: Hillary Beall (LAG)
Coach of the Year: Troye Flannery (CAL)

All-League First Team
F: Kate Howarth (NEM), Alex Lamontagne (CAL)
M: Tatiana Ariza (HOU), Marti Corby (GRA), Samantha Dewey (IND), Yvonne Northover (CAL), Teresa Rook (LAN)
D: Natalie Jacobs (LAG), Sonia Rada (LAN),  Yadira Toraya (SCB)
G: Hillary Beall (LAG)

All-League Second Team
F: Kaley Buck (LAN), Haley Crawford (LAN), Gabriella Mencotti (DET)
M: Vivien Beil (CON), Jordan Marada (LAG), Alexis Mitchell (LAN)
M/D: Ellie Jean (NEM), Molly McLaughlin (IND)
D/M: Natalia Ariza (HOU)
D: Athena Biondi (LAN)
G: Kelly O'Brien (LAN)

All-League Third Team
F: Tanya Boychuk (CAL), Taylor Wingerden (ROC), Bri Woodall (SAN)
M: Brooke Barbuto (SYR), Tara McKeown (SCB), Chelsey Patterson (LAG)
D: Shauny Alterisio (NEM), Paige Hayward (HOU), Julia Leonard (IND),  Grace Stordy (CAL)
G: Liz-Amanda Brown (AUS)

References

External links 
 

 
2019
1